Bashkirs is a painting by William Allan,  painted, signed and dated in 1814. The original title of the painting: "The Bashkirs, consorts sentenced to Siberia".

References

External links
Hermitage: digital collection

1814 paintings
Paintings in the collection of the Hermitage Museum
Scottish paintings
Paintings of people